Eagle Bay is a hamlet (and census-designated place) on Route 28 in the town of Webb in Herkimer County, New York, United States. Eagle Bay is on the border of Herkimer and Hamilton counties, and borders Fourth Lake.

Nearby communities 
 Big Moose
 Inlet
 Old Forge

References

Footnotes and citations

Sources

External links
 "An Adirondack Escape on Fourth Lake: Eagle Bay, NY", Adirondack.net
  Google Map of Eagle Bay area
 Satellite image from MSR Maps

Hamlets in New York (state)
Hamlets in Herkimer County, New York